Blankenberg may refer to:

Blankenberg, Mecklenburg-Vorpommern, part of the Amt Sternberger Seenlandschaft, district of Parchim, Mecklenburg-Vorpommern, Germany
Blankenberg, Thuringia, part of the Verwaltungsgemeinschaft Saale-Rennsteig, Saale-Orla-Kreis, Thuringia, Germany
Blankenberg, North Rhine-Westphalia, near Siegburg, part of Hennef (Sieg)

See also
Blankenberge, Belgian town
Blankenburg (disambiguation)